The prime minister of Vanuatu is the head of government of the Republic of Vanuatu.

The office of Prime Minister was created under the Constitution of Vanuatu upon the country's independence in 1980, with independence campaigner Walter Lini becoming the first office-holder. The position is sometimes seen as a continuation of the older office of Chief Minister, which existed before Vanuatu obtained its independence.  The prime minister is required by the Constitution to be a member of Parliament, which also directly elects him or her into office.  The prime minister directly appoints or dismisses members of the Council of Ministers (cabinet ministers).

So far 13 men have served as Prime Minister of Vanuatu, some on multiple occasions.

The current prime minister is Ishmael Kalsakau from Union of Moderate Parties, since 4 November 2022.

Disputes

In November 2009, Prime Minister Edward Natapei was briefly declared by the Speaker to have lost his seat over a procedural technicality. The courts invalidated the ruling, and Natapei regained his seat, and thus the premiership.

Serge Vohor's fourth term in office, from April to May 2011, is included in the list below, although his election to the premiership was voided as unconstitutional by the Court of Appeal on 13 May, on the grounds that he had been elected only by a majority of members of Parliament (26 out of 52), not by an absolute majority. Ralph Regenvanu, who regained his position as Minister for Justice after the annulment of Vohor's premiership, stated: "Prime Minister Serge Vohor and his cabinet are illegal, null and void and were never the government of the country."

Similarly, Sato Kilman's term is included although it was also voided, by a ruling from Chief Justice Vincent Lunabek on 16 June 2011, finding that Kilman's election in December 2010 had not been in conformity with the requirements for a secret parliamentary ballot set out in article 41 of the Constitution. Thus, following Edward Natapei's ousting in a valid motion of no confidence in December 2010, Vanuatu had no lawfully constituted government until Natapei was restored in June with instructions from the court to convene Parliament for the election of a prime minister. This was done on 26 June, resulting in Sato Kilman's election to the premiership by Parliament – his first legally recognised term as Prime Minister.

List of prime ministers

See also
 Politics of Vanuatu
 President of Vanuatu
 List of resident commissioners of the New Hebrides

References

Vanuatu, prime minister of
Vanuatuan politicians
Politics of Vanuatu
 
1980 establishments in Vanuatu
Prime Minister